Pasquale Cajano (born Pasquale Cagiano; August 19, 1921 in Italy– October 24, 2000) was an Italian-American New York City Italian AM Radio personality DJ in the 1960s and later career a film actor. After two uncredited cameo appearances in The Age of Innocence and Where Evil Lies, his friend Martin Scorsese cast him in the 1995 crime drama Casino as Chicago Outfit boss Remo Gaggi, the film's de facto antagonist and inspired by the real-life Joseph Aiuppa.

After Casino, Cajano went on with small roles in certain films, like Big Night, Sleepers, and The Impostors (another uncredited role). Cajano was then cast alongside his Casino co-star Robert De Niro in the hit comedy Analyze This. Pasquale Cajano was also a well known Italian radio personality for many years on the Italian Communications Network radio (www.icnradio.com).

On October 24, 2000, Cajano died of prostate cancer at the age of 79.

Filmography

References

External links
 
 winbox apk

1921 births
2000 deaths
American male film actors
Italian emigrants to the United States
20th-century American male actors
Deaths from prostate cancer
Deaths from cancer in the United States